The 63 Crayons was a band of musicians active from 2000 - 2009. Formed in Roanoke, Virginia, band members Charlie Johnston (guitar, vocals), Suzanne Allison (keyboards, vocals), and Ben Davis (theremin and sampled sounds) relocated to Athens, Georgia in 2003, where they were joined by Derek Almstead (drums). Both their 2002 EP, "Spread the Love" and their 2004 full-length album, "Good People" were released by Happy Happy Birthday To Me Records. Their last album, "Spoils For Survivors", was self-released. Members Suzanne Allison and Charlie Johnston also performed with the Elephant Six Orchestra under the name of The 63 Crayons on the first Elephant Six Holiday Surprise Tour in 2009. The Holiday surprise line up featured Charlie Johnston (vocals, guitar), Suzanne Allison (drums), Will Cullen Hart (drums), Theo Hilton (bass), John Fernandes (violin), Julian Koster (banjo). Charlie Johnston also helped to produce and engineer the second full-length release by Athens Georgia-based band Circulatory System called "Signal Morning".  Former band members include: Marshall Young (drums), Michelle Ferguson (bass), Joseph Davis (bass), Sam Lunsford (drums).

References 

 
 The Elephant 6 Orchestra in Concert
 63 Crayons Live @ Little Kings 2006-08-11
  Photos by Deadly Designs, Caledonia Lounge, 01-12-2007

Rock music groups from Virginia
Rock music groups from Georgia (U.S. state)